The House of Marcello is a noble family of Venice, once ascribed to the Venetian Patriciate.

History
According to the tradition that Venice would be the legitimate heir of ancient Rome, the Marcellos would be direct descendants of the Claudii Marcelli, which would have transplanted into the lagoon during the seventh century; here it would have contributed to the foundation of Rialto, giving tribunes. According to some rumors, in the past they had been called Macigni (or Massi), Storculissi and Scrovoresi.

According to the historical documentation, the first known Marcellos appear in a public deed of 982. The family is originally from Torcello (a Pietro is mentioned, a gastald of the island and judge between the 11th and 12th centuries), but in the second half of the 12th century their transfer to the Realtino archipelago is attested.

The so-called "pseudo-Giustinian" Chronicle (1350s), while recognizing their role in the birth of the Republic, lists them among the families of recent nobility, the so-called curti (those who had been part of the nobility for a short period of time). Nevertheless, from the fourteenth century the Marcellos began to have an important role in Venetian public life, competing with the most prestigious families, the longhi (those who had been part of the nobility since a long time), in the division of offices.

It was above all in the fifteenth century that the family became the protagonist of various political and military events: for example, Jacopo Antonio di Pietro (1397–1464 / 65), who was responsible for the liberation of Brescia and Verona occupied by the Visconti (with the notable enterprise of transporting of a fleet over the Adige by land); Nicolò di Giovanni (1397–1474) who, after a brilliant public career, was elected doge in 1473; Jacopo di Cristoforo (1413–1484), general da mar, who died during the conquest of Gallipoli; Pietro di Jacopo Antonio (1446–1530), who took part in the War of Ferrara (1482–1484), with which the Serenissima subdued Polesine.

Two centuries later it was Lorenzo di Andrea (1603–1656) who distinguished himself in the fight against the Turks, directing the victorious expedition of the Dardanelles, in which, however, he lost his life.

To these are added numerous ecclesiastics and men of culture. The most important were undoubtedly Benedetto (1686–1739), a famous composer of the Baroque period, and his brother Alessandro (1673–1747), himself a composer.

After the fall of the Serenissima, the Marcellos were one of the few Venetian families to maintain a leading role in administrative life. Prominent Marcellos of this period include  (1813–1871), mayor of Venice from 1857 to 1859;  (1860–1940), soldier and senator of the Kingdom of Italy;  (1894–1980), anti-fascist and academic.

Notable members 

 Pietro Marcello (1376 ca.–1428), bishop and humanist;
 Nicolò Marcello (1397–1474), doge;
 Jacopo Antonio Marcello (1397–1464/65), statesman and military leader; 
 Jacopo Marcello (1413–1484), admiral;
 Lorenzo Marcello (1603–1656), admiral;
 Alessandro Marcello (1669–1747), musician and composer;
 Benedetto Marcello (1686–1739), musician and composer;
  (1813–1871), politician and podestà of Venice from 1857 to 1859;
  (1860–1940), soldier and politician;
  (1894–1980), soldier and academician.

Palaces and villas 
 in Venice
Palazzo Moro Marcello in Venice
Palazzo Marcello in Cannaregio, Venice
Palazzo Zon Marcello in Venice
 in Levada di Piombino Dese
 in Selva del Montello di Volpago del Montello
 in Fontanelle
 in  di Preganziol
 in Preganziol

References

Venetian noble families
Republic of Venice families